Jingzhou District is a district of the city of Jingzhou, Hubei, Central China.

Administrative divisions
Three subdistricts:
Xicheng Subdistrict, Dongcheng Subdistrict, Chengnan Subdistrict

Seven towns:
Jinan, Chuandian, Mashan, Balingshan, Libu, Mishi, Yingcheng

Two other areas:
Taihugang, Lingjiaohu

References

County-level divisions of Hubei
Jingzhou